The Retaliators is a 2022 American thriller / action horror film released by Better Noise Films starring Michael Lombardi, Marc Menchaca, and Joseph Gatt which debuted at Arrow FrightFest London. The film also features appearances by musicians Tommy Lee, Jacoby Shaddix, Zoltan Bathory, and The HU.  The Retaliators was released on digital video-on-demand (VOD) In USA and Canada on October 21, 2022, after the film debuted in theaters on September 14, 2022.

Premise 
The film follows John Bishop (Michael Lombardi) whose daughter is brutally murdered and he seeks vengeance for her death, at the point to have the chance being face to face with his daughter's murderer.  Will he be able to keep on with this veangeance and make the murderer pay ? .

Cast 
 Michael Lombardi as John Bishop
 Marc Menchaca as Detective Jed Sawyer
 Joseph Gatt as Ramon "Ram" Kady
 Katie Kelly as Sarah Bishop
 Abbey Hafer as Rebecca Bishop
 Jacoby Shaddix as Quinn Brady
 Ivan Moody as Victor "Vic" Kady
 Zoltan Bathory as Fang
 Chris Kael as Decker
 Tommy Lee as Strip Club DJ
 Craig Mabbitt as Mutant 
 Robert John Burke as Captain Briggs
 Brian O'Halloran as Intimidating Man
 Gigi Gustin as Cynthia
 Spencer Charnas as Max
 Gemma McIlhenny as Sharon

American rock band From Ashes to New, also makes a cameo appearance as "Church Band" in Bishop's church.

Production 
With director, Bridget Smith of 'Sno Babies' and Samuel Gonzalez Jr., The Retaliators started shooting in 2020, production then continued as the COVID-19 lockdowns were lifted.

The finished post production with Kyle Dixon and Michael Stein to score the sound track.

Music 
The theme song for the movie "The Retaliators 21 Bullets" was written by Nikki Sixx and James Michael and was released on August 5, 2022 as a lead track of the movie with the track featuring Mötley Crüe, Asking Alexandria, Ice Nine Kills and From Ashes to New ahead of the soundtrack release on September 16, 2022. 

Jacoby Shaddix of Papa Roach, who stars as Quinn Brady in the film, announced to Allison Haggendorf of Spotify that their song 'The Ending' will feature in the soundtrack. "When I heard about this film last year, I spoke to the creative team and I felt I had a vehicle to see if I could expand my range as an artist.  Truly, I couldn't have imagined how much I enjoyed this experience and can't wait to find another film in the future"

Release 
The Retaliators had its world premier on August 30, 2021 at the covid reduced audience FrightFest film festival in London, England, UK. The film made its American debut with a small screening due to covid on October 12, 2021 at Screamfest film festival held in Los Angeles, California and the film release was moved to 2022. The film was released on video on demand in US & Canada on Oct 21, 2022, after its world wide theatrical release on September 14, 2022.

Reception
On the review aggregator website Rotten Tomatoes, the film holds an approval rating of 88% based on 42 reviews and a weighted average rating of 5.9/10. The website's consensus reads: "It may not offer much they haven't seen before, but strong-stomached exploitation enthusiasts will savor The Retaliators." On Metacritic, it was given a score of 48 out of 100 based on 6 critics, indicating "Mixed or average reviews".

Music videos 
Extracts of The Retaliators film footage have already appeared in music videos that have been pre-announcing the film.

References

External links
 
 Official Better Noise Films Site
 

2022 horror thriller films
2020s English-language films
Films postponed due to the COVID-19 pandemic
Films set in 2022
American horror thriller films
2020s American films